Zha Jizuo (1601–1676) was a Chinese writer and scholar who lived during the late Ming dynasty and early Qing dynasty.

Names 
Zha Jizuo's given name was originally Jiyou before he changed it to Jizuo. His courtesy name was originally Sanxiu but was later changed to Yousan. He was also known by various pseudonyms, including Yihuang, Yuzhai, Dongshan Diaoshi, Dongshan Diaoyu, Zuoyi Feiren, and Jingxiu Xiansheng.

Life under the Ming dynasty 
Zha was born in an impoverished family in Haining, Zhejiang Province during the late Ming dynasty. His ancestral home was in Wuyuan County, Jiangxi Province. His father was Zha Erhan. In 1633, he sat for the imperial examination and obtained the position of juren.

After the fall of the Ming dynasty in 1644, Zha accompanied Zhu Yihai, the Prince of Lu, to Shaoxing, where the latter proclaimed himself the regent of the Southern Ming, a state formed by Ming loyalists. Zha was appointed as an official in the Ministry of War of the Southern Ming government. When the forces of the Manchu-led Qing dynasty invaded Zhejiang Province, Zha joined the Southern Ming forces in resisting the invaders until Shaoxing fell to Qing forces in 1646.

Life under the Qing dynasty 
Zha then went into retirement in present-day Xiashi District in Haining, Zhejiang Province. In 1652, he moved to Hangzhou, where he taught at Juejue School near the West Lake and later at Jingxiu School in Tiezhiling. He had thousands of students, who referred to him as "Jingxiu Xiansheng".

In 1661, Zha was implicated in a case of literary inquisition involving a merchant, Zhuang Tinglong, who had sponsored the publication of an unauthorised book on the history of the Ming dynasty because Zha had helped to proofread the book before it was published. (This book was different from the History of Ming, which was approved by the Qing government.) Although Zha was arrested and imprisoned, he was eventually released.

Two historical texts – Lang Qian Ji Wen and Ming Shi Ji Shi Ben Mo – mentioned that Zha was responsible for reporting the unauthorised book to the Qing government.

Another account stated that Wu Liuqi saved Zha from imprisonment because he wanted to repay Zha's kindness. Zha himself denied this account in Zha Jizuo Nianpu. Wu Qian (1733–1813) also wrote in Bai Jing Lou Shi Hua that the account involving Wu Liuqi was unreliable and unlikely to be true.

In his later years, Zha wrote a number of books and other writings, including Zui Wei Lu, Guo Shou Lu, Lu Chunqiu, Dongshan Guoyu, Ban Han Shi Lun, and Xu Xixiang.

Relation to Jin Yong 
Zha was from the scholarly Zha clan of Haining, whose members include the wuxia writer Zha Liangyong, who is better known by his pen name Jin Yong. Jin Yong was also born in the same place as Zha Jizuo: Haining, Zhejiang. Zha Jizuo appears as a minor character in one of Jin Yong's novels, The Deer and the Cauldron.

References

Further reading 

1601 births
1676 deaths
Qing dynasty writers
Ming dynasty writers
Writers from Jiaxing
People from Haining
17th-century theatre managers